The Kelvin–Helmholtz instability (after Lord Kelvin and Hermann von Helmholtz) is a fluid instability that occurs when there is velocity shear in a single continuous fluid or a velocity difference across the interface between two fluids. Kelvin-Helmholtz instabilities are visible in the atmospheres of planets and moons, such as in cloud formations on Earth or the Red Spot on Jupiter, and the atmospheres of the Sun and other stars.

Theory overview and mathematical concepts

Fluid dynamics predicts the onset of instability and transition to turbulent flow within fluids of different densities moving at different speeds. If surface tension is ignored, two fluids in parallel motion with different velocities and densities yield an interface that is unstable to short-wavelength perturbations for all speeds. However, surface tension is able to stabilize the short wavelength instability up to a threshold velocity.

If the density and velocity vary continuously in space (with the lighter layers uppermost, so that the fluid is RT-stable), the dynamics of the Kelvin-Helmholtz instability is described by the Taylor–Goldstein equation: 
 where  denotes the Brunt–Väisälä frequency, U is the horizontal parallel velocity, k is the wave number, c is the eigenvalue parameter of the problem,  is complex amplitude of the stream function. Its onset is given by the Richardson number . These effects are common in cloud layers. The study of this instability is applicable in plasma physics, for example in inertial confinement fusion and the plasma–beryllium interface. In situations where there is a state of static stability, evident by heavier fluids found below than the lower fluid, the Rayleigh-Taylor instability can be ignored as the Kelvin–Helmholtz instability is sufficient given the conditions.

Numerically, the Kelvin–Helmholtz instability is simulated in a temporal or a spatial approach. In the temporal approach, the flow is considered in a periodic (cyclic) box "moving" at mean speed (absolute instability). In the spatial approach, simulations mimic a lab experiment with natural inlet and outlet conditions (convective instability).

See also 
 Rayleigh–Taylor instability
 Richtmyer–Meshkov instability
 Mushroom cloud
 Plateau–Rayleigh instability
 Kármán vortex street
 Taylor–Couette flow
 Fluid mechanics
 Fluid dynamics
Reynolds number
Turbulence

Notes

References 

 Article describing discovery of K-H waves in deep ocean:

External links 

 
 Giant Tsunami-Shaped Clouds Roll Across Alabama Sky - Natalie Wolchover, Livescience via Yahoo.com
 Tsunami Cloud Hits Florida Coastline
 Vortex formation in free jet - YouTube video showing Kelvin Helmholtz waves on the edge of a free jet visualised in a scientific experiment.
 Wave clouds over Christchurch City
 Kelvin-Helmholtz clouds, in Barmouth, Gwynedd, on 18 February 2017

Fluid dynamics
Boundary layer meteorology
Clouds
Fluid dynamic instabilities
Articles containing video clips
Hermann von Helmholtz
William Thomson, 1st Baron Kelvin
Plasma instabilities